Jovair de Oliveira Arantes (born Buriti Alegre, June 4, 1951) is a Brazilian politician.

Jovair Arantes is an advisor and has been leader of the Atlético Goianiense.

Jovair is known for being the rapporteur of the impeachment of Dilma Rousseff in the Chamber of Deputies. His report was, then, approved and proceeded to the Plenary to be voted by all of the 513 deputies.

On 7 July 2016, deputy Eduardo Cunha (PMDB-RJ) resigned of his office of Speaker of the Chamber. Acting Speaker Waldir Maranhão called in for new elections on the same day. Jovair Arantes wanted to run for Speaker, but gave up to support deputy Rogério Rosso (PSD-DF).

References

External links
Sítio oficial
Câmara dos Deputados - Dados do deputado

Members of the Chamber of Deputies (Brazil) from Goiás
1951 births
Living people
Brazilian Labour Party (current) politicians
Brazilian Social Democracy Party politicians
Brazilian Democratic Movement politicians